Saint-Côme-d'Olt (literally Saint-Côme of Olt) is a commune in the Aveyron department in southern France. It is one of the Les Plus Beaux Villages de France (most beautiful villages of France).

Geography
The commune is located in the Lot valley, near the confluence with the river called Boralde of Saint-Chély-d'Aubrac.

Way of St. James
Saint-Côme-d'Olt with its twisted church spire is located on the Le Puy route of the Way of St. James.
Pilgrims come from Saint-Chély-d'Aubrac. Their next stage is Espalion, and its church of Perse.

Population

Administration

See also
Communes of the Aveyron department

References

Communes of Aveyron
Plus Beaux Villages de France
Aveyron communes articles needing translation from French Wikipedia